The Glanville Blacksmith Shop is a historic brick building located at 45 Bank Street in the town of Morristown in Morris County, New Jersey. Part of the Morristown Multiple Resource Area (MRA), it was added to the National Register of Historic Places on March 25, 1987, for its significance in architecture. The listing also includes a former livery stable, the frame building at 47 Bank Street.

History and description
In 1895, J. P. Glanville moved his blacksmith shop to this location. In 1901, Frank J. Glanville was the blacksmith in a new building. The two and one-half story brick building features vernacular Colonial Revival style and a semi-octagonal front bay. In 1905, Henry W. Armstrong was operating a new livery stable next to the blacksmith shop.

See also
 National Register of Historic Places listings in Morris County, New Jersey

References

Morristown, New Jersey
Blacksmith shops	
Buildings and structures in Morris County, New Jersey
National Register of Historic Places in Morris County, New Jersey
1901 establishments in New Jersey
New Jersey Register of Historic Places
Brick buildings and structures